A Misappropriated Turkey is a 1913 American drama film directed by  D. W. Griffith.

Cast
 Charles West as The Striker
 Claire McDowell as Mrs. Fallon
Edna Foster as The Striker's Son
 Harry Carey as The Bartender
 John T. Dillon as Union Member
 Frank Evans as Union Member
 Robert Harron as Union Member
 Walter P. Lewis as Union Member
 Charles Hill Mailes as Union Member
 Joseph McDermott as Union Member/In Bar
 W. Chrystie Miller as Union Member
 Jack Pickford as On Street

See also
 Harry Carey filmography
 D. W. Griffith filmography

External links

1913 films
1913 short films
1913 drama films
Films directed by D. W. Griffith
American silent short films
American black-and-white films
Silent American drama films
1910s American films